Major Thomas David Freeman-Mitford (2 January 1909 – 30 March 1945) was the only son of the 2nd Baron Redesdale and brother of the Mitford Sisters. Tom Mitford was killed in action during the Second World War.

Early life

Mitford was born on 2 January 1909, the only son of David Freeman-Mitford, 2nd Baron Redesdale.  He attended Eton College. He had relationships with several students there, among whom were Jim Lees-Milne and The Hon. Hamish St. Clair-Erskine (later engaged to his sister Nancy).

In the late 1920s, Mitford studied law in Berlin and it was at that time that he displayed a favour for the Nazi Party.

Military service and death
While serving, at first Mitford chose to serve in Italy and North Africa, and then in Burma, since he did not want to fight against Germany.

Mitford was killed on 30 March 1945 in Burma, while serving with the Devonshire Regiment. He is buried at Taukkyan War Cemetery. His sister Diana, Lady Mosley, wrote: "his loss was something from which I never recovered for the rest of my life". His father, Lord Redesdale, erected a memorial tablet inside St Mary's Church, Swinbrook, near their ancestral home, Swinbrook House. The 2nd Baron Redesdale, Lady Mosley, Nancy Mitford, and Unity Mitford are buried in the churchyard, while Pamela Mitford is buried in the northwest of the tower. Another tablet to the memory of Tom Mitford is inside Holy Trinity Church, Horsley, just south of Rochester, Northumberland, near their estate in Northumberland.

Personal life
In July 1929, Mitford took part in the "Bruno Hat" art hoax. He took the role of the imaginary reclusive artist, Bruno Hat; other Bright Young Things involved were Brian Howard, Evelyn Waugh, Bryan Guinness, and John Banting.

Mitford had an alleged affair with James Lees-Milne, a writer, when both were attending Eton.

In the summer of 1930, Mitford met Sheilah Graham, who would later describe him in her memoirs, Beloved Infidel, as "a youthful edition of his father and, at twenty-one, one of the handsomest men I had ever seen".

In the 1930s, he was a lover of Austrian-born dancer Tilly Losch, while she was married to art patron Edward James.

References

External links
 

1909 births
1945 deaths
People educated at Eton College
Bisexual men
Eldest sons of British hereditary barons
British Army personnel killed in World War II
Tom
Heirs apparent who never acceded
Devonshire Regiment officers
Burials at Taukkyan War Cemetery
20th-century English LGBT people